Martin Horn (born 23 September 1969) is a paralympic athlete from Germany competing mainly in category T44 sprint events.

Martin competed in the 1996 Summer Paralympics in the 100m, 200m and long jump but it was in the 2000 Summer Paralympics he won his only medal.  There he competed in the 100m and was part of both the 4 × 400 m and third placed 4 × 100 m teams.

He represents the sports club LAZ Zweibrücken.

References

Paralympic athletes of Germany
Athletes (track and field) at the 1996 Summer Paralympics
Athletes (track and field) at the 2000 Summer Paralympics
Paralympic bronze medalists for Germany
Living people
Medalists at the 2000 Summer Paralympics
1969 births
Paralympic medalists in athletics (track and field)
German male sprinters
Sprinters with limb difference
Paralympic sprinters